Mammoth Spring is a large karst spring in the U.S. state of Arkansas.

Mammoth Spring may also refer to:

 Mammoth Spring (Illinois), a water spring in DuPage County
 Mammoth Spring, Arkansas, a community
 Mammoth Spring State Park, Fulton County, Arkansas

See also
 Mammoth Hot Springs, in Yellowstone National Park
 Mammoth (disambiguation)